Lupașcu is a Romanian surname. Notable people with the surname include:

Camelia Lupașcu, Romanian rower
Daniel Lupașcu, Romanian football player
Stéphane Lupasco, né Ștefan Lupașcu
Ștefana Velisar Teodoreanu, née Maria Ștefana Lupașcu

Romanian-language surnames